Nancy Vieira Couto (born 1942) is an American poet. She is a recipient of the Agnes Lynch Starrett Poetry Prize and the
National Endowment for the Arts for Poetry award.

Life
She received her BS in Education from Bridgewater State College in 1964, and her MFA in English from Cornell University, in 1980.  She has been poetry editor at Epoch magazine for the past ten years.

Her work has appeared in American Voice, Black Warrior Review, Diagram, Iowa Review, Kalliope, Mississippi Review, Nimrod, Prairie Schooner, Salamander, Shenandoah, Southern Review.

She lives in Ithaca, New York.

Awards
 1989 Agnes Lynch Starrett Poetry Prize
 National Endowment for the Arts for Poetry 1987 and 1999

Works
"THE BUTTERFLY EFFECT"; "THE COMMON ACCIDENT"; "BEYOND MODERNITY, WE ARE WARNED"; "THE ACCIDENTALS", Poems x 4

Anthology

Translation

References

Living people
Agnes Lynch Starrett Poetry Prize winners
American people of Portuguese descent
Cornell University alumni
1942 births
American women poets
21st-century American women